Belle Époque refers to a period in European history that began during the late 19th century and lasted until World War I.

Belle Époque or La Belle Époque may also refer to:
Belle Époque (film), a 1992 Spanish film directed by Fernando Trueba
Belle Epoque (band), a European disco music group popular in the mid to late 1970s
La Belle Époque (film), a 2019 French film directed by Nicolas Bedos
La Belle Epoque (barge), a 1930 luxury barge
"La Belle Epoque" (song), a 2014 song by Swedish rock band Kent
La Belle Epoque, album by Orchestra Baobab
Belle Époque, prestige label of Perrier-Jouët